The following is a list of some 1789 colonial governors:

Portugal
 Angola – José de Almeida e Vasconcellos de Soveral e Carvalho, Governor of Angola (1784–1790)
 Macau –
 Francisco Xavier de Mendonca Corte-Real, Governor of Macau (1788–1789)
 Lazaro da Silva Ferreira, Governor of Macau (1789–1790)
 Manuel Antonio Costa Ferreira, Military Commander (1789–1790)

Great Britain
 Bermuda – Henry Hamilton, Lt. Governor of Bermuda (1788–1794)
 New South Wales – Arthur Phillip, Governor of New South Wales (1788–1792)

See also
 List of state leaders in 1789

Colonial governors
Colonial governors
1789